Afton Villa Gardens is a historic formal garden on the grounds of a former slave plantation in St. Francisville, Louisiana, U.S..

History
The land belonged to William Barrow when it was purchased by his brother, Bartholomew Barrow, in 1820. The latter sold it to his son, David Barrow, in 1839. When Senator Alexander Barrow died in 1846, he was buried on the grounds. In 1849, David Barrow and his second wife, Susan A. Woolfolk, established a plantation and had a great house built. It was designed in the Gothic Revival architectural style. Meanwhile, they also designed formal gardens.

The mansion burned down in 1963, but the gardens are still maintained. They have been listed on the National Register of Historic Places since February 24, 1983.

References

Houses on the National Register of Historic Places in Louisiana
Houses completed in 1849
Gothic Revival architecture in Louisiana
Buildings and structures in West Feliciana Parish, Louisiana
Plantations in Louisiana
Gardens in Louisiana